Zulfi Hoxha (born 16 January 1992), also known by the nom de guerre (kunya) Abu Hamza al-Amriki, was an Albanian-American Islamic State (IS) senior commander and recruiter of foreign fighters fighting in Syria and in Iraq.

Background and education
The son of an Albanian-American pizzeria owner, Ramadan Hoxha, in Margate City, New Jersey. Hoxha's parents immigrated to the United States from Albania. He is a 2010 graduate of Atlantic City High School. He was described as shy and closed. Hoxha was described by former co-workers as using to joke "I Hate You, Americans."

Islamist career
Hoxha left the United States on 6 April 2015 for Turkey and four days later joined an IS training camp in Syria. Usaama Rahim and David Wright, co-conspirators in the 2015 Boston beheading plot who were "part of a wider network that was in communication with Islamic State operatives in Syria," raised the funds and made the arrangements that enabled Hoxha to travel to Turkey, make contact with, and join ISIS in Syria.

Within six months he was featured in a video where several captured Kurdish soldiers are beheaded; Hoxha is the first to behead one of the captives. It might be the first known case of an American IS member beheading individuals on video, and it is the first case in which the US government confirmed the name and American citizenship of an IS member featured in IS media. He is present in the propaganda video We Will Surely Guide Them To Our Ways published in May 2017, where he says in English "Are you incapable of stabbing a kaffir [non-Muslim] with a knife, throwing him off of a building, or running him over with a car? Liberate yourself from hellfire by killing a kaffir", located in Nineveh in northwestern Iraq. In an alternative translation by La Stampa and the BBC, in the May 2017 video Al-Amriki makes an appeal to Muslims to avenge the "women and children killed by the uncontrolled bombing of (Mosul by) the United States," saying, "Are you not able to use a knife against the infidels, to throw them from a building, to run them over with a car?"  As Al Ameriki, he also appeared in a video showcasing ISIS weaponry.

Hoxha is one of only a "few dozen" Americans to have gone overseas to join Islamist terrorists; others include John Georgelas and Abdullah Ramo Pazara.

See also
 Lavdrim Muhaxheri
 Ridvan Haqifi

Notes

Citations

Sources

Further reading

External links
 MEMRI report on ISIS video featuring Al Ameriki

1992 births
American Islamists
American Muslims
American people of Albanian descent
Atlantic City High School alumni
Islamic State of Iraq and the Levant members
People from Margate City, New Jersey
Possibly living people